Cricket is a talking doll that was first unveiled in February 1986 at the American International Toy Fair in New York. It was the first major product sold by Playmates Toys, a Hong Kong-based company that until then had previously mostly imported toys from overseas and distributed them for the U.S. market.

Cricket was designed by Larry Jones at California R&D Center. Talking animal toys such as Worlds of Wonder's Teddy Ruxpin and Mother Goose dolls had previously been sold, but Playmates' concept was to create a humanistic doll with simulated speech capability. The scripts and songs were written by Robin Frederick and Jay Tverdak. Cricket's catchphrases, including "Are we having fun or what?" and "I'll be talkin' to ya!" were written by Jones. Cricket was voiced by nine-year-old Laura Mooney.

The Cricket dolls operated in similar fashion to that of Teddy Ruxpin, but had two-sided cassette tapes instead of tapes with sound and movement data on separate tracks. The doll required four "C" batteries for the player and one nine-volt battery for the mouth movement.

Cricket was available in models with black and white skin colors. The black Cricket doll was released with two different hairstyles. One featured hair identical to that of the white version with two curly pigtails tied with pink yarn. The other version had short curly hair with no ribbons.

Cricket was sold wearing a pink sweater, yellow underpants, pleated mint green skirt, yellow socks and pink high-top sneakers with monogrammed laces. Her sweater came in two variations, one knitted and the other velour. Cricket also came with her "health plan" and two tapes, one labeled "Operating & Caring for Cricket" and the other, which was unlabeled, featured songs, jokes and stories.

The Cricket line was discontinued before all of the planned products could be released. These included the book and tape set “Cricket Visits Australia” and a planned device named the “Chatterbox” which would enable Cricket and Corky to interact in much the same manner as the Grubby accessory for Teddy Ruxpin. Despite this, the products continued to be included in lists and advertised in pamphlets packaged with the doll.

Book and tape sets
Cricket Books were all hardcover and featured interesting facts and instructions for various crafts and activities.

 Cricket's Clubhouse
 Holiday Fun with Cricket
 Growing Up with Cricket
 Cricket Takes a Vacation
 Around the World with Cricket
 Cricket Goes to the Circus
 Cricket Visits Spain
 Cricket Goes Camping
 Cricket Visits the Zoo
 Cricket's Special Surprise 
 Cricket Visits Australia (unreleased)
 Cricket Visits China (unreleased)

Outfit and tape sets
These sets included a tape with games, jokes and stories and a coordinating outfit with accessories.

 Cricket goes to the County Fair
 Time for Outdoor Fun
 Sleepy Time
 Party Time
 Indoor Play Time
 School Time
 Time for Health and Exercise
 Cricket Goes to a Wedding
 Cricket Tours the Hospital

Other accessories
 Cricket's Kitty Shadow (Tape and grey plush cat included)
 Cooking with Cricket (Included tape, plastic utensils and recipe book)
 Cricket's Favorite Games (Board Game with tape)
 Cricket and Corky’s Chatterbox with “Let’s Play Together” tape (unreleased) 
 Cricket's Sneakers (Available in blue, red, purple or yellow)
 Cricket's Very Own Chair
 Cricket's Slumber Party Sack

Corky
Cricket had a younger brother named Corky which was released in 1987 and voiced by seven-year-old Edan Gross. Corky was available in both black and white-skinned models. Tapes that were produced for Corkey either came with an appropriate outfit or a workbook which included activities related to math or reading.
 Let’s Play Outdoors (Included workbook)
 Let’s Play at My House (Included workbook)
 Let’s Play at School (Included workbook)
 Corky’s Big Game (Included baseball outfit)
 Corky’s Adventure Scouts (Included scout uniform)
 Corky’s Star Ship (Included astronaut outfit)
 Corky's Very Own Chair
 Corky's Sleep Sack 'N Pack

Jill
Cricket also had an older sister named Jill (voice actress currently unknown), who also operated in much the same way as did Cricket and Corky. Jill however used cartridges instead of tapes and had voice-recognition capabilities. Jill was available in both black and white-skinned models. In 1989, an inanimate version of Jill with no speech capability was produced. Jill's catchphrase was "I'm a lot like you.". Extra cartridges could be bought separately in sets; the sets included a cartridge, an outfit, and various related accessories.
 Jill Babysits
 Jill's First Job
 Jill's Cheerleading Tryouts
 Jill's Staring Role
 Jill's Slumber Party
 Jill Goes to the Mall

Other merchandise
In addition to the collection of Cricket books, outfits and tapes, Playmates produced coloring books, paper dolls, and home videos.

In 1987 two videocassettes were produced by Hi-Tops Video using audio from already released audiocassettes including “Cricket's Clubhouse” and “Around the World with Cricket.” Also in 1987 four coloring books illustrated by Pam Posey and Kathy Allert were published including “Cricket’s Clubhouse”, “Cricket’s First Day of School”, “Cricket’s Round the World Tour” and “Cricket’s Busy Day”. In 1988 Random House published the illustrated story book “Cricket and the Birthday Ring” written by Emily James.

References

External links
 Doll Info - Playmates Cricket Talking Doll
 Are We Having Fun or What??? - Cricket & Corky Dolls

Doll brands
Playmates Toys